Shenkeng District is a rural district in central New Taipei City in northern Taiwan. Formerly an agricultural and mining town, it is now famous for its numerous tofu restaurants and vendors.

History 
The area is first recorded as the preserve of a tribe of Pingpu aborigines during the Qing dynasty period in Taiwan. When Han Chinese farmers eventually moved in to develop the area, they bought the low-lying land from the aborigines and began cultivation in the main valley. The modern name of the township, Shenkeng, literally means deep pit or deep mine. The area used to have several active coal mines. The name has also been explained with reference to the mountains surrounding Shenkeng on all sides, which make the terrain similar to a pit.

On December 25, 2010, Shenkeng Township became Shenkeng District.

Geography 

Shenkeng is a rural district which borders Taipei City's Wenshan District to the west, Nangang District to the north, and the Shiding District of New Taipei City to the east.

Politics and government 
Politics in Shenkeng have largely been uneventful; the town is considered a safe seat for the Kuomintang. An exception was in 1996, when several members of the council were arrested on suspicion of connection with organised crime.

Administrative divisions
Shenkeng District includes eight urban villages:
 Shenkeng, Puxin, Wanshun, Wanfu, Tuku, Laizhong, Arou, Shenggao

Demographics

In the years 2012 to 2017, the population of Shenkeng District hovered around 23,600 with a steadily ageing population.

Education 
Shenkeng is home to Tungnan University, a private technical university. There is also a Junior High School and an Elementary School in the town.

Tourist attractions
The economy of Shenkeng is centred on tourism, and that tourism is based largely on tofu. The district is sufficiently well known in culinary circles that it has been a subject of media interest in Japan and Hong Kong. The tofu from Shenkeng has an unusual ratio of soybean to gypsum, giving it a yellowish colour and distinctive flavour. The town has become so readily identified with tofu that it has earned the epithet "The Tofu Capital".

There are also extensive hiking trails, some of which were in use during the Japanese era by anti-Japanese guerilla fighters.

 Shenkeng Old Street

Transportation 
Transportation in Shenkeng is limited to roads only; there is as yet no railway or mass transit service, although proposals have been made to extend the Wenshan Line of the Taipei Metro into Shenkeng. Three bus companies offer passenger services within Shenkeng and between Shenkeng and surrounding settlements.

See also
 New Taipei City

Notes

References

External links
  
 VTS 02 1 (about Tofu in Shenkeng) 

Districts of New Taipei